Lake Tyrrell is a locality in Victoria, Australia, located approximately 95 km from Robinvale, Victoria. The locality is named after the nearby Lake Tyrrell.

References

Towns in Victoria (Australia)
Mallee (Victoria)